The Treasure Seekers is a 1996 British television family film directed by Juliet May and starring Camilla Power, Felicity Jones and Kristopher Milnes. In Edwardian Britain, a family have only a few days to raise enough money to stop their home being repossessed. It is based on the 1899 novel The Story of the Treasure Seekers by E. Nesbit.

Cast
 Patsy Byrne – Eliza 
 Peter Capaldi – Jellicoe
 Nigel Davenport – Lord Blackstock
 Nicholas Farrell – Richard Bastable
 William Forde – H.O. Bastable
 Tom Georgeson – Bates
 Alexander Harding – Albert-Next-Door
 Felicity Jones – Alice Bastable
 Keira Knightley – The Princess
 Gina McKee – Mary Leslie 
 Kristopher Milnes – Oswald Bastable
 Camilla Power – Dora Bastable
 Ian Richardson – Haig  
 Ben Simpson – Noel Bastable
 Roger Sloman – Wiggins
 James Wilby – Henry Carlisle (Albert's uncle)

References

External links
 .
 .

British television films
1996 television films
1996 films
Films set in the 1900s
Films set in England
Films based on British novels
ITV television dramas
Television series by Fremantle (company)
Films directed by Juliet May
1990s English-language films